Peggy Michell and Phoebe Watson successfully defended their title, defeating Phyllis Covell and Dorothy Shepherd-Barron in the final, 6–4, 8–6 to win the ladies' doubles tennis title at the 1929 Wimbledon Championships.

Seeds

  Betty Nuthall /  Elizabeth Ryan (semifinals)
  Peggy Michell /  Phoebe Watson (champions)
  Phyllis Covell /  Dorothy Shepherd-Barron (final)
  Bobbie Heine /  Alida Neave (first round)

Draw

Finals

Top half

Section 1

Section 2

The nationality of M French is unknown.

Bottom half

Section 3

Section 4

References

External links

Women's Doubles
Wimbledon Championship by year – Women's doubles
Wimbledon Championships - Doubles
Wimbledon Championships - Doubles